is a Japanese slice of life romance shōjo manga series written and illustrated by Fuyu Kumaoka. Published by Kodansha, it's serialized on Bessatsu Friend magazine and has been compiled into ten volumes so far.
The author of the series is Kumaoka Fuyu.

Volumes
1 (August 11, 2011)
2 (February 13, 2012)
3 (June 13, 2012)
4 (October 12, 2012)
5 (February 13, 2013)
6 (June 13, 2013)
7 (November 13, 2013)
8 (March 13, 2014)
9 (July 11, 2014)
10 (February 13, 2015)

Reception
Volume 4 reached the 32nd place on the weekly Oricon manga charts and, as of October 21, 2012, has sold 46,272 copies; volume 5 reached the 10th place and, as of February 24, 2013, has sold 71,646 copies; volume 6 reached the 9th place and, as of June 22, 2013, has sold 86,789 copies; volume 7 reached the 3rd place and, as of November 24, 2013, has sold 99,870 copies; volume 8 reached the 7th place and, as of March 23, 2014, has sold 107,484 copies; volume 9 reached the 11th place and, as of July 2, 2014, has sold 108,787 copies; volume 10 also reached the 11th place and, as of March 1, 2015, has sold 132,550 copies.

References

External links

2011 manga
Slice of life anime and manga
Romance anime and manga
Kodansha manga
Shōjo manga